The western pine elfin (Callophrys eryphon) is a North American butterfly that ranges from British Columbia east to Maine and south to southern California, Arizona, and New Mexico. Males are brown and females are orange-brown, with both having bold patterned hind wings. The top of the wings have dark bars with a lighter chevron shaped margin. The body is 19–32 mm in length and has no tail.

This butterfly is found in natural pine woods and evergreen forests in the territory (area of land) they inhabit. In the northwest United States they are found nesting in lodgepole pines and can be seen perched on shrubs and smaller trees while searching for food or looking for a mate. The  western pine elfin is seldom seen outside its natural habitat. They feed on flower nectar including wild blueberries, milkweed, and clover.

Reproduction
The adults emerge from the caterpillar hibernation stage and have one flight cycle in early spring from March to June and the female lays eggs  on the base of new pine needles. The adult pair produce only one brood. The mature larvae are 15 mm long.  The head of the caterpillar is green and the fine hair covered body is velvet green with cream to yellow stripes.
It is a defoliating insect that feeds on the young pine needles until it enters  hibernation in  late July or August.

Status
The western pine elfin has few predators and its conservation status is globally secure with no real threats.

References

External links

 Western Pine Elfin
Talk about Wildlife
Conifer Defoliating Insects  of British Columbia
Large Images of Western Pine Elfins
Western Pine Elfin, Butterflies of Canada

Callophrys
Butterflies of North America
Butterflies described in 1852